Anachariesthes abyssinica is a species of beetle in the family Cerambycidae, and the only species in the genus Anachariesthes. It was described by Müller in 1949.

References

Tragocephalini
Beetles described in 1949